Maplecroft is a global risk and strategic consulting firm based in Bath, England. Its work includes analyzing risks affecting global business and investors.

Maplecroft is regularly quoted in the media, particularly on political risk, economics, and the environment.

Similar companies
 ArmorGroup
 Control Risks
 Eurasia Group
 Kroll
 Pinkerton

References

Companies based in Bath, Somerset
Consulting firms established in 1975
Security consulting firms
1975 establishments in England